New South Wales has 17 Regional Organisations of Councils  (ROCs) which are voluntary groupings of councils in Australia. ROCs usually involve collaborative partnerships between neighbouring councils in a particular region or area.

New South Wales and Queensland have the most active ROC movements in Australia; most councils in New South Wales and all those located in the Sydney metropolitan area belong to a ROC.

Sydney metropolitan ROCs 

With the demise of the Inner Metropolitan Regional Organisation of Councils as an active ROC, there are six ROCs in the metropolitan area:

 Shore Regional Organisation of Councils (SHOROC - Manly, Mosman, Pittwater & Warringah councils)
 Central Coast Regional Organisation of Councils (CCROC)
 Northern Sydney Regional Organisation of Councils (NSROC)
 Southern Sydney Regional Organisation of Councils (SSROC)
 Western Sydney Regional Organisation of Councils (WSROC)
 Sydney Coastal Councils Group Inc (SCCG - a special purpose ROC focusing upon sustainable management of the coastal environment)

With the exception of some councils which are on the border of two ROCs and have decided to become joint members of both, the above represent distinct regional groupings. In addition, a number of coastal councils also belong to the Sydney Coastal Councils Group Inc  which functions as a ROC in addressing environmental and natural resource management issues relating to the Sydney coastline.

Some metropolitan ROCs, in particular SHOROC, WSROC, NSROC and SSROC are particularly active in areas such as regional advocacy and joint activities involving their member councils such as regional tendering agreements. A more detailed description of the functions of ROCs can be found in the article Regional Organisations of Councils.

ROCs outside the metropolitan area

There are a number of active ROCs outside the metropolitan area, most notably in the Hunter and Illawarra. Non-metropolitan ROCs include:

 Central NSW Councils (CENTROC)
 Hunter Councils Inc
 Mid North Coast Group of Councils
 Namoi Regional Organisation of Councils (NamoiROC)
 New England Local Government Group
 Northern Rivers Regional Organisation of Councils (NOROC)
 Orana Regional Organisation of Councils (OROC)
 Riverina Eastern Regional Organisation of Councils (REROC)
 Riverina and Murray Regional Organisation of Councils (RAMROC)
 South East Regional Organisation of Councils (SEROC)
 Southern Councils Group

See also 
 Regional Organisations of Councils
 Regions of New South Wales
 Local government areas of New South Wales
 Western Sydney Regional Organisation of Councils

References

External links 
 Australian Local Government Association Regional Organisations of Councils page
 NSW Department of Local Government Directory - Regional Organisations of Councils
 Central NSW Councils (CENTROC)
 Hunter Councils Inc
 Macarthur Regional Organisation of Councils (MACROC)
 Northern Sydney Regional Organisation of Councils (NSROC)
 Riverina Eastern Regional Organisation of Councils (REROC)
 Shore Regional Organisation of Councils (SHOROC)
 Southern Councils Group
 Southern Sydney Regional Organisation of Councils (SSROC)
 Sydney Coastal Councils Group Inc
 Western Sydney Regional Organisation of Councils (WSROC)

Local government in New South Wales
Organisations based in New South Wales